Robert Desimone is the director of the McGovern Institute for Brain Research and the Doris and Don Berkey Professor of Neuroscience at the Massachusetts Institute of Technology. 

The McGovern Institute was founded at MIT by Patrick Joseph McGovern and Lore Harp McGovern with a dual mission of conducting basic research on the mind and brain and applying that knowledge to help the many people suffering from brain disorders. Prior to joining the McGovern Institute in 2004, Robert Desimone was the director of intramural research at the National Institute of Mental Health. He is a member of the US National Academy of Sciences and American Academy of Arts and Sciences and is recognized for his research on the brain mechanisms that underlie visual perception, attention, and executive control. At the McGovern Institute, he is promoting the development of systems neuroscience, novel neuroscience technologies, and the translation of basic research findings into new treatments that improve human health, including new approaches to brain disorders such as autism and schizophrenia. 

From 2014-2018, Desimone was featured as an international guest judge on The Brain, a televised competition of unique mental skills in China, where it is one of the most popular TV series. He is married with two children.

Research
As a graduate student at Princeton, Desimone and his thesis supervisor Charles Gross were the first to publish data that neurons respond specifically to faces. At NIMH, he described the physiological properties  of neurons in extrastriate visual cortex, and he and Leslie Ungerleider mapped the topographic organization and anatomical connections  of many new cortical visual areas. With Earl Miller, he discovered a physiological basis for recency memory (repetition suppression) and working memory in inferior temporal cortex. He reported evidence for the role of attention in modulating the neuronal properties of areas in the ventral stream, and he and John Duncan proposed a Biased Competition Theory to explain many aspects of attention control. With John Reynolds, he proposed a quantitative model of biased competition to explain the effects of attention on neurons, which is formally a normalization model. With Pascal Fries, he described the effects of attention on synchronized activity in extrastriate cortex, and he later found that synchronized activity between extrastriate cortex and prefrontal cortex is a mechanistic feature of selective attention

Education
Desimone received his BA from Macalester College in 1974 and his Ph.D. from Princeton University in 1979.

Awards

 Golden Brain Award, 1994;
 Troland Research Awards, 1990;
 Goldman-Rakic Prize, 2020
 Ralph Gerard Prize of the Society for Neuroscience, 2021;

References

External links
 McGovern Institute for Brain Research at MIT
  Ear Plugs to Lasers: The Science of Concentration. New York Times May 4, 2009
 The Anatomy of Attention, Alan Lightman, The New Yorker, Oct 1, 2014
 MIT Technology Review, A Turning Point. December 18, 2014
  Tsinghua university McGovern Institute
 Peking University McGovern Institute
 Beijing Normal University McGovern Institute
 McGovern Institutes US-China
 China-Japan Brain competition
 video profile on MIT tech TV
 

Members of the United States National Academy of Sciences
American neuroscientists
Living people
Fellows of the American Academy of Arts and Sciences
Year of birth missing (living people)
Massachusetts Institute of Technology alumni